is a Japanese singer-songwriter. He made his debut with the single .

He has composed, written and performed numerous songs for several anime, including Fantastic Children, Tsubasa Chronicle, the Gorō Taniguchi-directed Sunrise productions, Planetes, s-CRY-ed, Code Geass, and Chivalry of a Failed Knight, as well as various other media.

Discography

Singles 
Toy's Factory
 
Released February 9, 1994

 
Released October 1, 1994

 something
Released May 10, 1995

 
Released February 1, 1996

 Dear
Released June 1, 1996

 
Released November 1, 1996

 Regrets
Released June 1, 1997

Victor Entertainment
 Drastic my soul
Released August 22, 2001
Ending & opening theme to the anime s-CRY-ed

 Dive in the sky
Released November 21, 2003
Opening and ending themes to the anime Planetes

Albums 
Toys Factory
 In Vogue
Released March 1, 1994

 scene
Released November 2, 1994

 Pieces
Released April 1, 1996

 Little Flowers
Released December 1, 1997

 my souls
Released March 28, 2012

Other 
 Anime s-CRY-ed O.S.T.2
November 21, 2001
Performance of the insert songs  and Discovery

 Anime Planetes O.S.T.2
March 24, 2004
Performance of the insert song: Thanks my friend

External links 
  
 
 

1970 births
Living people
Japanese composers
Japanese male composers
Japanese male singer-songwriters
Japanese singer-songwriters
Musicians from Sapporo
21st-century Japanese singers
21st-century Japanese male singers